Stony Plain is a town in the Edmonton Metropolitan Region of Alberta, Canada that is surrounded by Parkland County. It is west of Edmonton adjacent to the City of Spruce Grove and sits on Treaty 6 land.

Stony Plain is known for its many painted murals representing various periods, events and people throughout the town's history. The town was originally known as Dog Rump Creek.

History 
The name of the town is believed to have come from one of two possible origins. The first is that the Stoney people camped in the area historically. The second possibility is that Dr. James Hector, a geologist on the Palliser Expedition, noticed boulders scattered across the area. The official name for the settlement was adopted in 1892. Alex McNabb and McPherson were the first homesteaders in the area.

Geography

Climate
has a humid continental climate (Köppen climate classification Dfb) It falls into the NRC Plant Hardiness Zone 4a.

Demographics 

In the 2016 Census of Population conducted by Statistics Canada, the Town of Stony Plain recorded a population of 17,189 living in 6,641 of its 6,954 total private dwellings, a  change from its 2011 population of 15,051.

Arts and culture 
Stony Plain is home to many colourful murals that depict important figures and events of local history. The Town held a mural project in 2006 where artists were selected through open competition to paint two murals. The Parkland Potters Guild & Crooked Pot Gallery is also located within Stony Plain.

Cultural institutions in the town include the Stony Plain Public Library, the Multicultural Heritage Centre, and the Stony Plain Pioneer Museum.

Stony Plain celebrates Farmers' Days in the first week of June each year, complete with the Farmers' Days Parade, the Kinsmen rodeo, a pancake breakfast and fair grounds. The town also plays host to the Great White North Triathlon in the first week of July.

In the summer, Stony Plain hosts two major festivals — the Blueberry Bluegrass and Country Music Festival, which is held in early August and is the largest bluegrass event in western Canada, and the Cowboy Poetry and Country Music Gathering held in late August.

In December, the town sets up a large Christmas tree on Main Street and is lit throughout the Christmas season. To celebrate New Year's Eve, the town holds its Family Fest event at Heritage Park. Family Fest features outdoor ice skating, hot chocolate and fireworks.

Attractions 
The Town of Stony Plain jointly owns and operates the TransAlta Tri Leisure Centre sports complex located within neighbouring Spruce Grove. The town is also home to the Multicultural Heritage Centre, the Pioneer Museum, and multiple parks including Shikaoi and Rotary, a skate park, a BMX park and a green path system running through town.

Government 
The town is governed by one mayor and six councillors.

Infrastructure 
Health care
Stony Plain is home to the WestView Health Centre, a 68-bed public hospital.

Education 
Parkland School Division operates five schools and an outreach centre within the town. Evergreen Catholic Separate Regional Division No. 2 operates a school for students in kindergarten through grade 8. There are also a variety of small private schools and home schooling organizations.

Sports 

The Stony Plain Eagles of Allan Cup Hockey West play out of Glenn Hall Arena.

Media 
Newspapers covering Stony Plain include the Stony Plain Reporter and the Tri Area News. On the radio 88.1 The One'

Notable people 
Brett Kulak – ice hockey player for the Edmonton Oilers
Cornelia Lucinda Railey Wood - Canadian politician, Social Credit MLA (1959-1967), former mayor of Stony Plain

Sister town
Stony Plain is twinned with Shikaoi, Hokkaido, Japan.

See also 
List of communities in Alberta
List of towns in Alberta

References

External links 

1907 establishments in Alberta
Edmonton Metropolitan Region
Towns in Alberta